The 1960 United States Senate election in Illinois took place on November 8, 1960. Incumbent Democratic United States Senator Paul Douglas was reelected to a third term.

Election information
The primary (held on April 12) and general election coincided with those for other federal offices (President and House) and those for state elections.

Turnout
Turnout in the primaries was 32.98%, with a total of 1,678,954 votes cast.

Turnout during the general election was 84.24%, with 4,632,796 votes cast.

Democratic primary
Incumbent Paul Douglas was renominated, running unopposed.

Results

Republican primary
Samuel W. Witwer won a crowded Republican primary. Witwer was an attorney known for his work on both state and federal constitutional reforms.

Candidates
 John R. Harrell
 John W. Lewis Jr., Illinois State Senator
 William H. Rentschler, newspaper publisher
 Samuel W. Witwer, attorney
 Warren E. Wright, former Illinois Treasurer

Results

Socialist Labor nomination
The Socialist Labor Party of America nominated Louis Fisher.

General election

Results

See also 
 1960 United States Senate elections

References

1960
Illinois
United States Senate